Gymnocypris chui is a species of cyprinid fish endemic to Tibet.

References 

Yunfei, W., 1987. A survey of the fish fauna of the Mount Namjagbarwa region in Xizang (Tibet), China. p. 109-112 In S.O. Kullander and B. Fernholm (eds.) Proc. V Congr. Europ. Ichthyol., Stockholm, Sweden. 

chui
Taxa named by Tchang Tchung-Lin
Fish described in 1964